Koichi Kusano (Kusano Koichi; born March 22, 1955) is a Japanese jurist who has served as an associate justice of the Supreme Court of Japan since 2019.

Education and career 
Kusano was born on March 22, 1955 in Japan. He attended the University of Tokyo and graduated with a degree in Law in 1978. He was appointed as a legal apprentice that same year. In 1980 he registered as an attorney, and in 1986 he received his Master of Laws degree from Harvard Law School. He continued as an attorney until 1994, when he became an auditor for Koito Manufacturing. In 1999 he became the director of Rakuten, a post which he held until 2004, when he entered into academia. From 2004 until 2018 he served as professor or visiting professor at several universities, including:

 2004-2005, 2007-2013: University of Tokyo Graduate School for Law and Politics
 2005-2007: Kyoto University Law School
 2013-2014: Keio University Law School
 2014-2018: Harvard Law School

He then received his Ph.D in Law in 2018, before his appointment to the Supreme Court in 2019.

Supreme Court 
On February 13, 2019, Kusano was appointed to the Supreme Court of Japan. In Japan, justices are formally nominated by the Emperor (at that time, Akihito) but in reality the Cabinet chooses the nominees and the Emperor's role is a formality.

Kusano's term is scheduled to end on March 21, 2025 (one day before he turns 70). This is because all members of the court have a mandatory retirement age of 70.

References 

1955 births
Japanese jurists
Living people
University of Tokyo alumni
Harvard Law School alumni